Snow is a 1993 EP by Scottish band Cocteau Twins, released in December 1993 on Fontana Records. It contains cover versions of the Christmas standards "Frosty the Snowman" and "Winter Wonderland". It is out of print, though its tracks appear on the compilation Lullabies to Violaine.

Background
Snow was released in extremely limited quantities; one expert suggested that fewer than 5,000 copies were made. One of the songs on the album, "Frosty the Snowman," was recorded more than a year before Snow'''s release, for an album to accompany a year-end issue of Volume. Robin Guthrie was reluctant to record Christmas songs, so the group opted to record non-specific winter songs instead.

Critical receptionSnow received fairly positive reviews from contemporary music critics despite its limited release. AllMusic's Ned Raggett called the EP "perfectly enjoyable," noted its calmness and praised Elizabeth Fraser's vocal performance. Hybrid Magazine's Tom Topkoff noted that the songs sounded similar to the group's non-holiday songs and declared that the album was "sure to bring you joy during each holiday season." Pitchfork'' named "Frosty the Snowman" the 36th best holiday song of all time.

Track listing
Adapted from Discogs and AllMusic.
 "Winter Wonderland" (Felix Bernard, Dick Smith) – 2:50
 "Frosty the Snowman" (Steve Nelson, Jack Rollins) – 2:55

Personnel
Adapted from AllMusic.
 Elizabeth Fraser – vocals
 Robin Guthrie – guitar
 Simon Raymonde – bass guitar
 Lifeboat Matey – image processing
 Lincoln Fong – additional engineering
 Andy Earl – photography
 Cocteau Twins – producer

Charts

References

1993 EPs
Cocteau Twins albums